The following lists events that happened during 1965 in Chile.

Incumbents
President of Chile: Eduardo Frei Montalva

Events

February
6 February – LAN Chile Flight 107 crashes in the Andes.
19 February - The sixth version of the Viña del Mar International Song Festival takes place.
Lake Cabrera tragedy: an avalanche that occurred in Lake Cabrera located at the foot of the Yates and Hornopirén volcanoes (current Hualaihué commune) in the early hours of the morning caused a giant wave and the disappearance and death of 26 people

March
7 March – Chilean parliamentary election, 1965, Christian Democratic Party obtains an absolute majority in the Chamber of Deputies
28 March – 1965 Valparaíso earthquake and the El Cobre dam failures With a magnitude of 7.4 degrees on the Richter scale, it leaves 280 dead and hundreds injured. The earthquake is perceived from Copiapó to Osorno, from North to South, and to Buenos Aires to the east.

July
3-25 July - Tour of President Eduardo Frei Montalva through Europe (Spain, Portugal, France and Italy) and South America (Brazil, Argentina, Uruguay, Venezuela, Colombia and Ecuador).

October
15 October – Sinking of Janequeo and Leucoton

November
6 November – Laguna del Desierto incident
13 November - Robert Kennedy, on a visit to Chile, passes through the city of Linares.

December
16 December - The Ministry of Housing and Urbanism (Chile) is created, in charge of the planning, development and construction of houses, in addition to planning the urbanization of cities.

Births
3 February – Jacqueline van Rysselberghe
6 March – Amparo Noguera
25 March – Mario Lepe
13 April – Mathias Klotz
17 April – Luis Pérez (Chilean footballer)
2 May – Myriam Hernández
12 May – Carolina Tohá
19 May – Cecilia Bolocco
19 May – Nicolás Larraín
29 May – Marcelo Ramírez
26 August – Carolina Arregui
31 August – Ricardo Gónzalez (footballer)
29 September – Francisco Undurraga
5 October – Alberto Arenas
25 October – Luis Jara (singer)
27 October – Rodrigo Hinzpeter

Deaths
25 March – Oscar Cristi (born 1916)
23 August – Francisco Antonio Encina (born 1874)

References 

 
Years of the 20th century in Chile
Chile